Rostanga orientalis is a species of sea slug, a dorid nudibranch, a marine gastropod mollusc in the family Discodorididae.

Distribution
This species was described from Hoi Ha, Hong Kong. It had previously been reported from Japan, but was misidentified as Rostanga muscula. It has also been reported from Korea.

Description
This dorid nudibranch is red, and the dorsum is covered with caryophyllidia; it is very similar to other species of Rostanga.

Ecology
The food of this species is unknown. Most species of Rostanga'' feed on sponges of the family Microcionidae.

References

Discodorididae
Gastropods described in 1989